No. 143 Squadron RAF was a Royal Air Force Squadron formed as a fighter unit in the First World War and reformed as an RAF Coastal Command fighter and anti-submarine unit in Second World War.

History

Formation and the First World War

No. 143 Squadron Royal Flying Corps was formed on 1 March 1918 and became a unit of the Royal Air Force a month later, but it disbanded on 31 October 1919 having operated the Sopwith Camel and Sopwith Snipe.

Reformation in the Second World War

The squadron reformed in June 1941 as a coastal command long range fighter unit based at RAF Aldergrove unit and equipped with the  Bristol Beaufighter. It was then stationed in Scotland, Northern Ireland and East Anglia and employed on anti-shipping missions. It re-equipped with the de Havilland Mosquito and was disbanded on 25 May 1945.

Aircraft operated

References

External links

 History of No.'s 141–145 Squadrons at RAF Web
 143 Squadron history on the official RAF website
 Squadron history and information on the 143 Squadron, Air Training Corps website

143
143
Military units and formations established in 1918
1918 establishments in the United Kingdom